Bane is a supervillain appearing in American comic books published by DC Comics. Created by writer Chuck Dixon and artist Graham Nolan, he made his debut in Batman: Vengeance of Bane #1 (January 1993). Bane is usually depicted as a dangerous adversary of the superhero Batman, and belongs to the collective of enemies that make up the Batman's rogues gallery. Possessing a mix of brute strength and exceptional intelligence, Bane is often credited as the only villain to have "broken the bat", defeating him both physically and mentally. Bane went on to kill Alfred Pennyworth in 2019 during the City of Bane storyline. He is the son of another Batman enemy, King Snake and has a clone/daughter named Vengeance, introduced in 2021. 

Robert Swenson portrayed Bane in the 1997 film Batman & Robin, while Tom Hardy played him in the 2012 film The Dark Knight Rises. Bane was also played by Shane West in the final season of the FOX television series Gotham. IGN's list of the Top 100 Comic Book Villains of All Time ranked Bane as #34.

Publication history

Chuck Dixon and Graham Nolan created the character for the Knightfall storyline. They developed the concept of Bane after an initial idea by Batman editor Dennis O'Neil.

O'Neil had previously created Bane's birthplace of Santa Prisca in The Question and the drug Venom in the storyline of the same name (published in the pages of Batman: Legends of the Dark Knight #16–20, and later reprinted as a trade paperback). In the pages of Azrael, O'Neil introduced Bane's perception of Venom as both an addiction and the weakness responsible for his earlier defeats.

Fictional character biography

Origin story
Bane's origin story is established in the storyline "Guttenberg". His father, Edmund Dorrance (better known as King Snake), had been a revolutionary who had escaped Santa Prisca's court system. The corrupt government decreed that his young son would serve out the man's life sentence, and thus Bane spent his childhood and early adult life in prison. Although he was imprisoned, his natural abilities allowed him to develop extraordinary skills within the prison's walls. He read as many books as he could get his hands on, spent most of his spare time body building in the prison's gym, developed his own form of meditation, and learned to fight in the merciless school of prison life. Because of the cultural and supposed geographical location of Santa Prisca, Bane knew how to speak English, Spanish, Portuguese, Persian, Urdu and Latin. Despite his circumstances, he found teachers of various sorts during his incarceration, ranging from hardened convicts to an elderly Jesuit priest, under whose tutelage he apparently received a classical education. Bane murdered this priest upon his return to Santa Prisca years later. He committed his first murder at the age of eight, stabbing a criminal who wanted to use him to gain information about the prison. During his years in prison, Bane carried a teddy bear he called Osito ("little bear" in Spanish), whom he considered his only friend. It is revealed that Osito has a hole in his back to hold a knife that Bane used to defend himself.

Bane is tortured by a monstrous, terrifying bat creature that appears in his dreams, thus giving him an intense fear of bats. He ultimately established himself as the "king" of Peña Duro prison and became known as Bane. The prison's controllers took note and eventually forced him to become a test subject for a mysterious drug known as Venom, which had killed all other subjects. The Peña Duro prison Venom experiment nearly killed Bane at first, but he survived and found that the drug vastly increases his physical strength, although he needs to take it every 12 hours (via a system of tubes pumped directly into his brain) or he will suffer debilitating side-effects. Bane escapes Peña Duro, along with several accomplices based on the Fabulous Five (his minions Trogg, Zombie and Angel Vallelunga/Bird, all of whom are named after 1960s rock bands—The Troggs, The Zombies, and The Byrds—and are designed to mimic three of Doc Savage's assistants Monk, Ham, and Renny). His ambition turns to destroying Batman, about whom he had heard stories from Bird. Gotham City fascinates Bane because, like Peña Duro, fear rules Gotham—but it is the fear of Batman. Bane is convinced that Batman is a personification of the demonic bat which had haunted his dreams since childhood. Therefore, Bane believes fate placed Batman on a collision course with him.

In Joker #8, it is revealed that Bane's daughter Vengeance was created in a lab by scientists.

Batman: Knightfall

During the "Knightfall" storyline, Bane, wanting Batman reduced to his weakest physical and psychological state, uses stolen munitions to destroy the walls of Arkham Asylum—allowing its deranged inmates (including the Joker, Two-Face, the Riddler, the Scarecrow, the Mad Hatter, the Ventriloquist, Firefly, Poison Ivy, Cornelius Stirk, Film Freak and Victor Zsasz) to escape into Gotham City. During this time, Bane murdered Film Freak who acted as the Mad Hatter's mind-controlled assassin, kidnapped and unsuccessfully interrogated Robin who was spying on him, and had a bloody rematch with Killer Croc which ended in a stalemate as they were washed out of the sewer. Consequently, Batman is forced to recapture the escapees, a mission that takes him three months and drives him to the brink of mental and physical collapse. Exhausted, Batman returns to his home in Wayne Manor, only to find Bane waiting for him. Bane attacks Batman and beats him nearly to death, and delivers a brutal final blow in which he raises Batman up and breaks him over one knee, leaving him a paraplegic. Bane thus becomes the only man to have "Broken the Bat". This iconic moment is incorporated in The Dark Knight Rises, Robot Chickens DC Comics Special and alluded to numerous times in the DCAU.

While Bane establishes himself as the new ruler of Gotham's criminal underworld, Bruce Wayne passed the mantle of Batman to Jean-Paul Valley, also known as Azrael. Ignoring Bruce's warnings to stay away from Bane, Azrael attempts to confront the villain in his penthouse suite. Azrael has by now added a set of high-tech, heavy metal gauntlets to the Batsuit, and uses them to shoot sharp projectiles at Bane. However, Bane is able to get the upper hand in the fight after using Venom and taunting Azrael, making him angry enough to lose focus and, thus, give Bane the opportunity to beat him. Nevertheless, Bane sustains deep lacerations in the battle and loses a great deal of blood.

Unable to go to a hospital, Bane increases his Venom intake to temporarily block the pain and buy himself time to defeat the new Batman. A humiliated Azrael returned to the Batcave and builds an advanced combat suit of metal, in place of the traditional Batsuit, with many chambers within the suit that fire razor-sharp weapons. Reduced to little more than a wounded animal fleeing for survival, Bane is no match against the "new" Batman. Bane is finally defeated when Azrael severs the tubes that pump Venom into his bloodstream, causing severe withdrawal. Commissioner James Gordon, Harvey Bullock, and Robin watch in horror as this new Batman tortures a defeated Bane, who begs his adversary to kill him. Azrael denies his innate urge to kill Bane, however, and leaves him humiliated and broken physically and mentally for the police to arrest.

Mask
Further following the events of Knightfall, Bane recovers from his Venom addiction while serving time in Blackgate Prison. He rebuilt his body to its peak and eventually escapes from prison and returns to Gotham, where he fights alongside the original Batman, who has by now recovered and taken his mantle back from Azrael, to take out a criminal ring that is distributing a Venom derivative to street-level thugs. Following a victory over the criminals (and the revelation that behind it is the same doctor that performed the surgery on Bane years earlier in Peña Duro), Bane proclaims that he is "innocent" of his past crimes and urges Batman to stop hunting him. He then leaves Gotham, without fighting Batman, to begin a search for his unknown father.

Bane's search brings him back to Santa Prisca. In search of leads, Bane questions the Jesuit priest who had taught him while he was in Peña Duro. The priest explains that there were four men who could possibly have been his father: a Santa Priscan revolutionary, an American doctor, an English mercenary, and a Swiss banker. While searching for the Swiss man in Rome, Bane encounters Talia al Ghul and the League of Assassins and eventually impresses Ra's al Ghul so much that he chooses Bane to marry Talia and become his heir. Ra's also has discovered Bane's father's identity, but did not reveal this information to him. Ra's al Ghul then launches a plague attack on Gotham in the "Legacy" storyline, with Bane at his side, who is posing as Ra's al Ghul's henchman Ubu. Batman gets his rematch with Bane in Detective Comics #701 and finally defeats him in single combat. Disappointed by his protegé's failure, Ra's calls off the engagement to Talia and disowns Bane.

Following the "Legacy" storyline, Bane appears in a one-shot publication called Batman: Bane (1997) with the intent of destroying Gotham City using a nuclear reactor. Batman foils the plot, however. During the "Angel and the Bane" storyline, Bane ambushes Azrael, brutally defeating and capturing him, before getting him addicted to an even more potent form of Venom. Azrael ultimately escaped into the jungle with Nomoz and successfully, albeit painfully, overcame his addiction with his enhanced stamina and strong will. The weakened and injured Azrael managed to psyche out and defeat Bane before escorting him back to the Cataclysm ravaged Gotham. Once in Gotham, Bane briefly escaped during an aftershock before Azrael quickly recaptured him. Bane then surfaces in the story arc "No Man's Land", serving as an enforcer for Lex Luthor during Luthor's attempts to take control of Gotham under the cover of helping it to rebuild, but Batman convinces Bane to leave after a brief confrontation between Bane and the Joker. Following the fallout with Ra's al Ghul, Bane embarks on a campaign to destroy Lazarus Pits around the world, and in the process, encounters the Black Canary.

"Tabula Rasa" and "Veritas Liberat"
In the "Tabula Rasa" storyline, Bane learns from the Jesuit priest that there is a possibility that his biological father is an American doctor. In researching this issue, Bane comes to the conclusion that he and Batman share a biological father: Thomas Wayne, who had been close to Bane's mother during his time in Santa Prisca. Bane alerts Batman to this possibility and, during the time that the DNA tests are being performed, stays at Wayne Manor and fights alongside Batman on the streets of Gotham. Ultimately, it is revealed that Dr. Wayne is not Bane's father, and Bane leaves Gotham peacefully – and with Batman's blessing and financial backing – to pursue leads in the snowy mountains of Kangchenjunga.

Bane eventually finds his father, who turns out to be the unscrupulous King Snake, in the "Veritas Liberat" storyline. Bane, with Batman looking on, helps foil King Snake's plans to unleash a powerful weapon upon the world. Bane saves Batman from being shot by King Snake, but is mortally wounded in the process. Batman then saves Bane by bathing him in a Lazarus Pit, and leaves him with a clean slate.

Infinite Crisis and One Year Later
In Infinite Crisis #7, Bane fights alongside the villains during the Battle of Metropolis. During the battle, he breaks the back of the hero Judomaster, killing him. No reason was given for his actions in #7, though in Infinite Crisis collected edition, one of the many changes made to the original series was Bane saying "I finally know who I am. I am 'Bane'. I 'break' people."

Bane resurfaces in the One Year Later continuity of JSA Classified #17–18 searching for the Hourmen (Rex and Rick Tyler), asking them for help. To win their trust, he tells them how, prior to the Battle of Metropolis, he returned to his homeland to put an end to the drug lords' government and in the process discovered that a new, more addictive strain of Venom had been created. In his furious carelessness to wipe out the drug trade, he was captured, and re-implanted with the cranial tubes, hooked to the new Venom, and now unable to shake off his addiction without dying from the withdrawal. Bane was forced to work as an enforcer for the drug cartel, unable to escape. Believing that Bane sought Rex Tyler's expertise in chemistry, Rick lets him approach his father, only to discover that the story is a ruse. Bane, who had never truly been addicted to Venom, had in fact wiped out the drug lords and destroyed every research note on Venom. He discovered in the process both strains of Venom derived from Rex Tyler's early research on Miraclo. He discovers from the Tylers that no written notes exist of Rex's work, captures Rex, and steals Rick's equipment, planning to kill Rex and force Rick to take the last of the new Venom, living forever as an addict. Rick manipulates Bane into using Miraclo and demolishing the building as he and his father escape, burying the mercenary in the rubble of the very same Santa Priscan penitentiary where his story began.

Eventually, Bane resurfaces in Santa Prisca and leads the country to democratic elections. Upon discovering that the elections were rigged by Computron, he uses his influence to enforce martial law, plunging the country into a civil war. Computron offers information to Checkmate who ordered him to rig the elections in exchange for their help to escape the country. Fire and Judomaster's son, Thomas Jagger, are sent on the mission, with Jagger debating whether or not to seek revenge for his father's murder. He fights Bane in order to allow Fire to escape, defeating him easily, but chooses not to kill him. At the end of the miniseries Suicide Squad: Raise the Flag, Amanda Waller recruits Bane into the Squad. In Outsiders #50, he appears once more to be wearing the tubing system to apply Venom. In Salvation Run #2, Bane is tricked by his fellow squad members, and sent to the prison planet. In Salvation Run #3, Bane remains with Lex Luthor's faction after the Joker's faction rebels against Luthor's leadership. He attacks Thunder and Lightning when they were attempting to feed Martian Manhunter. Superman/Batman #53-#56 reveals Bane is trading his Venom supplies with drug lords around the globe. One of his shipments includes a trip to Gotham. Batman, who was temporarily endowed with Superman's powers, responded by attacking Bane at his home. Not only was the Dark Knight able to easily defeat the villain, the hero nearly killed him with his far superior strength. Bane survived his injuries due to the enhanced stamina from his Venom supplies.

Secret Six vol. 3
From September 2008, Bane appears as a regular character in the ongoing Secret Six series. In the first issue, Bane is depicted as a stoic devil's advocate for the group, offering alternative points of view for both Deadshot and Catman on the subject of love. He is later shown to have an almost fatherlike concern for Scandal Savage's well-being. Although this is largely played for laughs in the early issues, the first arc's final issue displays the depth of Bane's affection. When the Six are attacked by an army of supervillains, a wounded (and seemingly dying) Bane's concern for Scandal results in temporarily breaking his vow to never take Venom again in order to save her. Bane is later shown to have recovered from his ordeal, appearing in Gotham City with Cat-Man and Ragdoll in an attempt to stem some of the chaos caused by the apparent death of Batman. During the team's several escapades, Bane reveals both deep respects for his onetime adversary and a painful yearning to assume the mantle of Batman, telling a trio of rescued citizens to tell people that it was the Batman who saved them. Bane ultimately gives his blessing to Dick Grayson, praying that "God help him." Following a near-disastrous mission, Bane assumes leadership over the Six. His first act as leader is to remove Scandal from active duty, not wishing for her to be endangered. In the latest issue of Secret Six, Bane's Secret Six and Scandal Savage's Secret Six finally square off against each other. Bane and Scandal engage in a one on one fight where he refuses to fight back until Scandal uses her Lamentation Blades to slash his throat. The card is ultimately used to resurrect Knockout.

Driven to near madness, Bane decides to lead the Secret Six to Gotham in an attempt to psychologically break Batman by killing several of his closest allies. The team kidnaps the Penguin, who Bane pumps for information about Batman's partners. In the final issue of the series, Bane ultimately decides on the Red Robin, Azrael and Batgirl as his victims. Before the Six can make their move, the Penguin betrays their location, resulting in a massive army of superheroes ranging from Green Lantern, Batman and the Superman family to the Justice League, the Birds of Prey, and Booster Gold converging on Gotham. The Secret Six stage a desperate last stand, but are quickly defeated. With the fates of the other Secret Six members left ambiguous, Bane is last shown being driven away in a Gotham police van. The ending of the issue implies that he plans to escape.

The New 52
In September 2011, The New 52 rebooted DC's continuity. In this new timeline, Bane is re-introduced in the DCU by Paul Jenkins, and David Finch's run on Batman: The Dark Knight (vol. 2). As Bruce Wayne is unable to keep up with the various legal conspiracies involving Batman Incorporated, he decides to investigate a breakout in Arkham. There, he finds criminals being fed a modified fear toxin that is mixed in with Venom which makes the criminals extremely strong and immune to fear. He finds it being given to criminals by a new foe named the White Rabbit; when Batman approaches her, she quickly defeats him and injects him with the fear toxin, which she then gives to the Flash. Bruce then finds Bane to be behind the new fear toxin and combats him. Bruce manages to burn the fear toxin out of his and the Flash's bodies by getting pushed to the limit. Bruce manages to defeat Bane and knock him off an edge, but is left confused by the White Rabbit. Bane is then washed away by the tide.

Bane later appears in Detective Comics vol. 2 #19, in the story "War Council". There, his look had been altered to include a vest and cargo pants, and he now has an army serving him. In the story, it is revealed in a flashback that prior to his appearance in Batman: The Dark Knight, Bane had intended to steal a nuclear device to threaten Gotham City, only to have a run-in with the Court of Owls, who prevented him from stealing the device and did not want him to interfere with their plans. Later, after Batman defeats Bane, a mysterious figure confronts the villain and informs him that the Court of Owls had undermined his plans. Bane returns to Santa Prisca to lead his army against them.

During the "Forever Evil" storyline, Scarecrow learns that Bane may be the cause of the Blackgate uprising and will be their leader in the impending war and that the Talons were stored at Blackgate on ice. Bane, having escaped Peña Dura Prison in Santa Prisca, ships his Venom to Gotham City to be there for when he arrives. As he is traveling to Gotham, he orchestrates the release of Blackgate's prisoners during the Crime Syndicate's broadcast to the world. Later, on board his ship, he prepares his men for the impending war with Scarecrow, and with Gotham in the distant, claims it will be his. Bane enters Blackgate through the sewers to join the prisoners there. While there, he comes across where the Talons are stored hoping to make them into his weapons. While the attack on Gotham City begins between Bane's men and the GCPD, Bane also approaches Professor Pyg, forcing him to join his cause, and spread word that everything in Gotham is now controlled by Bane. Bane arrives at Blackgate as the Man-Bat and his fellow bats are attempting to transport the Talons to Mr. Freeze and is able to keep one from leaving. Bane retrieves Emperor Penguin for the Penguin as part of their agreement.

When Bane brings Emperor Penguin to the Penguin, the Penguin tells him that the Arkham fighters are not scared of Bane, as he does not instill fear as Batman did. Realizing this, Bane constructs a Batsuit for himself and heads to Wayne Tower to confront Killer Croc. Bane fights Killer Croc and is able to defeat him, setting his sights on retrieving the Talons. Bane wakes up the Talon William Cobb and takes him through Gotham where he fights various inmates of Arkham Asylum. Bane begins recruiting Gotham citizens to his side, offering his base at Wayne Tower as a haven to the people to escape the rule of the Arkham inmates. He tells Cobb his plan to turn the city over to the Court, in exchange for use of Talons at his disposal to be powered by his Venom. The Talons attack Bane's men, and eventually set their target on Bane. With Cobb's help, Bane is able to injure the Talons enough to activate their regenerative powers to remove the mind-control technology.

During Batman: Eternal, after Alfred is attacked by Hush and infected with a fear toxin, he is briefly transferred to Arkham before it is attacked as part of the conspiracy. However, Alfred manages to survive the explosion of the asylum and trick Bane into helping him reach an emergency cave Batman had installed under Arkham, the cave's defenses knocking Bane out and allowing Alfred to call for help.

DC Rebirth
At the beginning of the DC Rebirth continuity, Bane still lives in Santa Prisca. In Batman vol. 3 #6, it is revealed that he had been trading Venom to Professor Hugo Strange in exchange for the services of the Psycho-Pirate, who was helping him overcome his addiction to the substance. Strange then used the Venom to revive the corpses of several of his patients, as seen in the Night of the Monster Men crossover. In Batman vol. 3 #10, Batman, per the suggestion of Amanda Waller, undertakes a suicide mission to Santa Prisca aided by Catwoman, the Bronze Tiger, the Ventriloquist, and the clown couple Punch and Jewellee to take the Psycho-Pirate from Bane. Batman needs the Psycho-Pirate to undo the damage he caused to Gotham Girl, and each member of the team will receive some sort of reward for their efforts. Bane captures Batman shortly after he arrives, and then breaks his back again and throws him into the cell where he spent his childhood. Batman escapes, however, and fixes his back on his own. After allowing Catwoman to "betray" him and having the Bronze Tiger and Punch and Jewellee fake their deaths, Batman uses the Ventriloquist to incapacitate the Psycho-Pirate and tells Catwoman to break Bane's back. This act of humiliation and the loss of the Psycho-Pirate causes Bane to snap and scream for Venom from the prison guards.

In Batman vol. 3 #16, Bane has recruited his old henchmen Bird, Trogg, and Zombie in his quest to break Batman once and for all before recapturing the Psycho-Pirate from Arkham Asylum. Bane hangs Dick Grayson, Jason Todd, and Damian Wayne in the Batcave before setting off for the asylum, but the three survive. Bane's henchmen then capture Catwoman, Duke Thomas, Commissioner Gordon, and the Bronze Tiger to cut Batman off from his allies. Bane beats Batman savagely in an alley and believes him dead, but finds out that Catwoman has escaped, freed the rest of the hostages, and tied up Bane's henchmen, giving Batman a chance to flee. Enraged, Bane storms Arkham Asylum where Alfred is forcing the Psycho-Pirate to undo the fear he inflicted upon Gotham Girl. Batman decides to release many of the inmates to fight Bane and thus buy Alfred and the Psycho-Pirate more time, but Bane easily beats the likes of Two-Face, Solomon Grundy, Amygdala, the Scarecrow, the Firefly, and the Mad Hatter, among others, before making the Riddler open a door to Batman for him. Bane and Batman then have another fight, with a bloodied Batman barely beating his nemesis.

Bane: Conquest

In the 12-issue miniseries Bane: Conquest, it is revealed that Bane survived his fight with Batman, as he focuses on his criminal exploits outside of Gotham City. Bane and his trio Bird, Zombie, and Trogg, learn of suspicious activity outside of Gotham and investigate it. They discover a freighter and several mercenaries transporting nuclear warheads and other armaments to Gotham, which leads them to suspect a terrorist attack. Because they interrupted the sale at sea, they suspect the buyer is still in Gotham. Thorough interrogations of local criminals point them to a warehouse that had already been raided by Batman, but they find the buyer who points them to Qurac. Bane impulsively storms the compound their lead informed them of and easily overwhelms the armed resistance. Bane is eventually subdued by a heavy-duty taser after battling Damocles, the mercenaries' arrogant but highly skilled leader; Bane's trio narrowly escape their exploding van. Bane later finds himself unmasked and jailed with several other men including Bruce Wayne. Batman had also been investigating Damocles before being captured. The two put aside their feud in order to plan an escape. Bane is subjected to extensive torture during interrogation, but does not break. Bane later acts on a hunch by jamming an opening in his cell which was used to deliver food and water. He and Bruce escape and head in separate directions. Bane goes on a rampage throughout the facility and eventually exacts bloody retribution upon the arrogant Damocles. Bane later uncovers a labyrinth of technology beneath the facility controlled by the outfit's true leader: the subhuman Dionysus, who is little more than a head and two pairs of limbs. Bane sees little value in Dionysus until discovering the latter's deep-rooted connections to various criminal outfits and activities, effectively making him an obscenely wealthy and powerful figure in the global criminal underworld.

Bane and his trio decide to appropriate Dionysus' vast criminal empire. After imprisoning Dionysus, they accept his challenge to destroy a formidable criminal adversary and target globally infamous thieves known as the Vor. While Bird watches over Dionysus, Bane and the others break into an apartment complex believed to be the heart of the Vor's operation because of its cache of weapons and money. Unfortunately, the careless Bird is incapacitated by the sneaky Dionysus, who alerts the local Spetsnaz claiming to have discovered terrorist activity. While Trogg and Zombie help themselves to valuables, Bane encounters Catwoman who had been forced by Russian law enforcement to hack the Vor or face incarceration. Catwoman gives Bane the slip and activates an alarm that alerts Vor foot soldiers; Dionysus hacks the building's security and initiates a lockdown that separates Bane from the others. Bane catches up to Catwoman and she fulfills her deal with Russian law enforcement by using the thumb drive they gave her to steal mass amounts of data from the Vor database. Catwoman tasers Bane and escapes and Bane regroups with Zombie and Trogg to narrowly escape the arriving Spetsnaz. Looking for a new challenge, Bane and his trio look to stagger Kobra by abducting its prophesied leader the Naja-Naja. They abduct the current Naja-Naja, a spoiled young man, while he is attending a fancy party. Bane and his trio later find themselves ambushed by Kobra forces and narrowly escape as the Naja-Naja is recovered by Kobra. Tragedy strikes, however, when the Naja-Naja is killed in a freak accident while entering his submarine. Directed by Dionysus, Bane and his trio take advantage of Kobra's void in leadership to search for the Naja-Naja's successor, believed by Kobra to be an infant with a snake birthmark born at precisely the moment his predecessor died. This search leads the trio around the globe and eventually to Bludhaven. Bane and the trio encounter Kobra agent Valentina, who has acquired the infant before an arriving Kobra airship forces Bane and the trio to make a painful and humiliating escape. To prevent the leaderless Kobra from infighting, Valentina directs the organization's attention towards systematically dismantling Bane's criminal empire. Bane is nonplussed about his rapid losses of territory and capital, which troubles Bird. The shift in the global criminal empire catches Batman's attention, leading him and Alfred to plan a trip. Bane reveals to the trio and Dionysus that they need an army and a general to battle Kobra. His first stop is in Russia to recruit the elderly but still lethal KGBeast.

In addition to the KGBeast, Bane also recruits the sniper Gunhawk and his partner Pistolera, the retired King Faraday and two others to go to war with Kobra. Bane has his operatives abduct a high-ranking member of Kobra for interrogation. While this is happening, Valentina grows frustrated with failed efforts by Kobra operatives to either capture Bane or confirm his death. Using Zombie's newly discovered power, Bane gets the location of Kobra's fortress from their captive. With this information, Bane and his team plan an assault on the Kobra fortress. Bane's team questions his strategy of striking at the heart of Kobra, because its fortress is in a heavily policed country, vaguely implied to be North Korea. To enact his plan, Bane stages an attack on a high-ranking military official to gain his trust and access sensitive information such as codes, passwords and necessary military clearance. Bird begins questioning Bane's dependence on Venom, believing it has dulled his judgment. Batman, who has infiltrated Bane's operation, places a call to Alfred asking for a special shipment to be sent to him. Zombie overhears the call and snitches to Dionysus who begins to decrypt the call, already knowing it was made to Gotham, which enrages Bane. With the sensitive military intel, Bane, Gunhawk, and Pistolera pass through a harbor checkpoint in a submarine containing weapons and Kobra disguises. Having split into two groups, Bane and his team infiltrate Kobra's stronghold. Valentina becomes suspicious of a power outage and puts the complex on high alert, sending the brunt of Kobra's forces to protect the Naja-Naja in his nursery. During the fighting, Bane becomes suspicious of the missing King Faraday and finds him transmitting to a third party. Bane, believing Faraday to be a disguised Bruce Wayne, ambushes him and breaks his back. After realizing his error, Bane is attacked by Valentina wearing an exo-suit, but quickly repels her. Bane makes a beeline to the nursery, which is empty save for several downed Kobra soldiers and a discarded mask once worn by the French mercenary the Crow. Bane vows to finally kill Batman when they next meet. Valentina pursues Batman and the infant before Bane interferes. Bane ultimately destroys the exo-suit before confronting Batman once more. Bane demands the infant, which he plans to use to usurp control of Kobra when Batman appeals to his humanity; rationalizing that Bane would never allow an innocent to be raised the same way he was. Bane allows Batman to depart with the infant aboard the submersible the "Sea Bat", which was the delivery that Batman asked Alfred to make. Bane escapes Kobra's wrath by boarding the Sea Bat. Faced with the loss of the Naja-Naja, Valentina and her peers decide to silence Kobra elder Rampo, who had been trying to marshal all of Kobra's forces to retrieve the infant. The infant appears on the doorstep of a Gotham orphanage, his birthmark having been obscured/replaced by a skin graft. Some nuns take in the infant, who had been left with some money and Bane's childhood teddy bear, Osito.

Powers and abilities
Bane is highly intelligent; in Bane of the Demon, Ra's al Ghul says that Bane "has a mind equal to the greatest he has known" (although he dismisses Bane's abilities as the cunning of an animal rather than the cultured, trained intellect of Batman). His strength is sufficient for him to lift 3-4 tons. In prison, he taught himself various scientific disciplines equal to the level of understanding of leading experts in those fields. He knows ten active languages and at least four additional arcane and dead ones. Among these are Spanish, English, French, German, Russian, Mandarin Chinese,
Persian, Dari, Urdu, and Latin. The Bane of the Demon storyline reveals that he has an eidetic memory. Within one year, he is able to deduce Batman's secret identity.

He is also highly devious and a superb strategist and tactician. In prison, Bane also invented his own form of calisthenics, meditation, and a fighting style that he uses against other well-known martial arts fighters within the DC Universe. Bane creator Chuck Dixon's early tales portray Bane as a very calm, centered warrior akin to Bruce Lee; in as much that he draws strength through calm meditation and the spiritual energy of the "very rock of Peña Dura". Dixon imbued Bane with an almost supernatural quality when he explained that Bane triumphed in all of his prison fights by employing these abilities, while his opponents had only rage and greed to propel them. Multiple scenes in "Vengeance of Bane" explore this aspect when it explains that Bane's mastery of meditation techniques "made time and space playthings to him." A subsequent scene that reinforces this ability comes when Bird first comes to Bane for help because he heard from other inmates that Bane has "magic... the kind that allows him to travel beyond the prison walls." Usage of Venom enhances his physical abilities, including his strength and healing process, to superhuman levels. In most incarnations of the character, Bane requires a specialized tank to help control the amount of Venom which he injects into his body.

Although Bane had sworn off using Venom in Vengeance of Bane II in 1995, and his character is actually written as having kept that promise to himself, it is still not uncommon for artists to draw Bane as still wearing the tube leading from his old wrist device to the back of his head, as well as almost all media adaptations of the character, show him actively using the Venom compound. Writer Gail Simone explained these lapses in the continuity of Bane's appearance in an issue of Secret Six, in which Deadshot remarked that Bane merely kept his old Venom equipment with him out of habit, even though Bane states that he would sooner die than use it again. However, he does use the venom to save his comrade and daughter-figure, Scandal Savage.

Other versions
Amalgam Comics
In the Amalgam Universe, Bane was combined with Marvel Comics' Nuke as HYDRA's Bane Simpson'''. Another version of Bane was merged with the Punisher and called the "Banisher". He is described as a "gun-toting, drugged up anti-hero who broke Bruce Wayne's back."

Kingdom Come
In the Kingdom Come reality, an aged Bruce Wayne mentions to Superman that Bane and Two-Face broke into Wayne Manor and destroyed it, after Batman's identity was exposed, leaving only the Batcave intact.

Elseworlds
Bane appeared in numerous Elseworlds including Batman: Nosferatu as a low-level criminal; a dead Bane appears in a brief cameo in JLA: Riddle of the Beast, killed by the Green Arrow.

Smallville
Bane appears in the Smallville comic book Smallville Season Eleven. In the story, Bane is brought to Arkham after a battle, where a Yellow Lantern Ring attaches itself to him, until Emil Hamilton "reboots" the Rings away from Arkham inmates. 

Batman/Teenage Mutant Ninja Turtles
In Batman/Teenage Mutant Ninja Turtles, Bane was mutated into a humanoid mutant African elephant by Shredder. Bane is eventually defeated by Batman and the Teenage Mutant Ninja Turtles and returns to normal along with the other villains while in A.R.G.U.S. custody. In the sequel miniseries, Bane is chosen by a faction of the League of Assassins to serve as their new leader, in the belief that only he has the strength to succeed where Ra's has failed, but when Donatello attempts to travel back to Batman's universe to talk with him about his current feelings of inadequacy, the transporter instead causes Donatello to swap with Bane, resulting in Bane taking over the Foot Clan and New York after developing an enhanced Venom produced by Baxter Stockman. He is eventually taken down by the Bat-Family, the Turtles, and Shredder.

Injustice: Gods Among Us
Bane makes his first appearance in Year Five of the Injustice: Gods Among Us comic series. He decides to ally himself with Superman's Regime that will give him a position of power, so he aides High Councillor Superman and Wonder Woman in subduing Doomsday. While initially suspicious of Bane's motivations, Superman is convinced Bane could be a valuable asset to the Regime and agrees. However, this decision does not bode well with the rest of the Regime, who openly resent the idea of working alongside their former enemies.

Batman '66
The Batman '66 comic features a version of Bane in the universe of the 1966 Batman TV Series. This version is a professional luchador and also the dictator of Skull City, Mexico. He allies himself with the Riddler, who stole an artifact from the Gotham Museum called the Crystal Skull. The Crystal Skull is the source of Bane's powers and creates Venom similar to an ancient Aztec practice Batman researched about. He imprisoned the mayor of Skull City after the mayor destroyed the first Crystal Skull and became the city's new leader. In Gotham, he challenged Batman to a wrestling match and was victorious when he appeared to break Batman's back, but Batman had a batarang on his back to prevent his spine from getting snapped. Batman challenged him to a rematch in Skull City and attached a device to Bane's face to prevent him from drinking the Venom. Batman gets the upper hand and allows Bane to be defeated by the luchadores of Skull City to reclaim their home from the tyrant.

Batman: White Knight
Bane appears in the 2017 series Batman: White Knight. Bane, along with several other Batman villains, is tricked by Jack Napier (who in this reality was a Joker who had been force-fed an overdose of pills by Batman, which temporarily cured him of his insanity) into drinking drinks that had been laced with particles from Clayface's body. This was done so that Napier, who was using the Mad Hatter's technology to control Clayface, could control them by way of Clayface's ability to control parts of his body that had been separated from him. Bane also appears in the sequel storyline Batman: Curse of the White Knight'', being among the villains murdered by Azrael.

In other media

See also
List of Batman family enemies

References

Characters created by Chuck Dixon
Characters created by Graham Nolan
Comics characters introduced in 1993
Batman characters
DC Comics characters who can move at superhuman speeds
DC Comics characters with accelerated healing
DC Comics characters with superhuman strength
DC Comics martial artists
DC Comics metahumans
Fictional assassins in comics
Fictional Caribbean people
Fictional characters without a name
Fictional crime bosses
Fictional drug addicts
Fictional drug dealers
Male film villains
Fictional English people
Fictional Latin American people
Fictional mass murderers
Fictional mercenaries in comics
Fictional mixed martial artists
Fictional characters with eidetic memory
Fictional characters with slowed ageing
Fictional characters with superhuman durability or invulnerability
Fictional prison escapees
Fictional super soldiers
Fictional terrorists
Fighting game characters
Male characters in television
Suicide Squad members
Villains in animated television series
Video game bosses
DC Comics male supervillains
Film supervillains